The Emily Wiley House is a historic building at 902 3rd Street and 301 I Street, Northwest, Washington, D.C., in the Mount Vernon Triangle neighborhood.

History
The Italianate home was constructed in 1869 to 1871. It served as Holy Rosary Church, established by Father Nicholas DeCarlo, from 1914 to 1919. During the 1920s, it was the headquarters for the National Colored Voters Union, and Smith and Robinson Club.

It was listed on the National Register of Historic Places in 2006.

References

External links

http://landmarkhunter.com/136812-emily-wiley-house/

Houses on the National Register of Historic Places in Washington, D.C.
Italianate architecture in Washington, D.C.
Houses completed in 1865